The 1730s BC was a decade lasting from January 1, 1739 BC to December 31, 1730 BC.

Events and trends
 1736 BC–According to the ultra-long chronology of the ancient Near East, this is the year the sack of Babylon occurred.

Significant people
 Samsu-iluna, king of Babylon since 1750 BC, according to the middle chronology
 Rim-Sin I, ruler of the Middle Eastern city-state of Larsa since 1758 BC, according to the short chronology. That same chronology records his death as being in 1699 BC.

References

18th century BC